A tripod stance is a behaviour in which quadruped animals rear up on their hind legs and use their tail to support this position. Several animals use this behaviour to improve observation or surveillance, and during feeding, grooming, thermoregulation, or fighting.

In mammals
The common dwarf mongoose (Helogale parvula) adopts a tripod stance when being vigilant for predators. In a similar mammal, the thirteen-lined ground squirrel
(Spermophilus tridecemlineatus), vigilance behaviour includes four postures: (1) quadrupedal alert (all four feet on the ground with head above the horizontal); (2) semiupright alert (on hind feet with a distinctive slouch); (3) upright alert (on hind feet with back straight and mostly perpendicular to the ground); (4) extended upright alert (similar to upright alert except that the squirrel extends its hind legs, (see image of meerkats). In meerkats (Suricata suricatta), the tripod stance may be adopted relatively briefly during foraging, in which case it is termed guarding behaviour, or for substantially longer periods when the animal is not foraging, in which case it is termed sentinel behaviour.
 
Macropods can stand erect on their hind legs, supported by their tail as the third leg of the tripod. Macropods also engage in "pentapedal locomotion," an energy-inefficient gait used at slow speed, in which "the tail is used, with the forelimbs, as the third leg of a tripod to support the animal while the large hind limbs are moved forward."

Giant armadillos (Priodontes maximus) have a well-developed sense of smell but poor eyesight. When approached by a potential threat, they rise up onto their hind legs, supported by the tail and begin to sniff from side to side. This tripod stance is similar to the defensive position adopted by anteaters and enables them to strike out with their sharply-hooked claws if suddenly attacked.

It has been reported that the desert woodrat (Neotoma lepida) gives birth "...in a bipedal position supported by the tail."

In reptiles and amphibians
Monitor lizards such as the Komodo dragon (Varanus komodoensis) quite commonly stand on a tripod formed by their hind legs and tail.

Spectacled salamanders (Salamandrina terdigitata) sometimes stand on their hind legs supported by their tail. This reveals their brightly coloured belly, but the behaviour (referred to as "stand up behaviour") is performed in the absence of other salamanders or predators, and its function is unknown.

Some dinosaurs may also have occasionally adopted a tripod stance.

Similar behaviour in non-quadrupeds
Several non-quadrupeds adopt a tripod-like stance and may have specialised structures to achieve this.

The tripodfish (Bathypterois grallator) has long, bony rays that protrude below its tail fin and both pectoral fins. The tripod fish spends much of its time standing on its three fins on the bottom of the ocean, hunting its food.

All woodpeckers have "zygodactyl" feet - two toes in front, two behind - as an aid in clinging to tree bark. In addition, stiff modified tail feathers on most species help to prop the bird in a tripod stance when clinging vertically.

Many leaf-mining moths adopt a tripod stance when resting on a surface.

See also
Ethogram

References

External links
Image of an otter in a tripod stance
Images of various rodent species in a tripod stance
Image of a monitor lizard in a tripod stance

Ethology